Kalleh Gerd is a village in Aliabad Rural District, in the Central District of Hashtrud County, East Azerbaijan Province, Iran. At the 2006 census, its population was 513, in 101 families.

References 

Towns and villages in Hashtrud County